"Hate You + Love You" is a song by American DJ trio Cheat Codes featuring American singer-songwriter AJ Mitchell, released through Epic Records on February 5, 2021, as the eighth single from their debut studio album Hellraisers, Pt. 1 (2021).

Background and content
Cheat Codes explained in a statement: "We've all had that experience with a friend, family member, girlfriend or boyfriend where you just have that feeling: I hate you but I love you at the same time. AJ Mitchell captures that every and we were so stoked to have him jump on this with us."

Credits and personnel
Credits adapted from Tidal.

 Henrik Michelsen – producer, composer, lyricist, programmer
 AJ Mitchell – composer, lyricist, associated performer
 Trevor Dahl – producer, composer, lyricist, associated performer
 Bryn Christopher – composer, lyricist
 Kevin Pederson – lyricist
 Koda – lyricist
 Matthew Elifritz – lyricist
 Sage Skolfield – assistant engineer
 Sean Solymar – assistant engineer
 Mike Dean – mastering engineer, mixing engineer

Charts

Weekly charts

Year-end charts

Release history

References

2021 songs
2021 singles
Cheat Codes (DJs) songs
AJ Mitchell songs
Epic Records singles
Songs written by AJ Mitchell
Songs written by Bryn Christopher